The first Kalvītis cabinet was the government of Latvia from 2 December 2004 to 7 November 2006.  It was the first government to be led by Aigars Kalvītis, who was Prime Minister from 2004 to 2007.  It took office on 2 December 2004, after the resignation of Indulis Emsis, succeeding the Emsis cabinet, which had lasted from March to December 2004.  It was replaced by the second Kalvītis cabinet on 7 November 2006, after the October 2006 election.

Government of Latvia
2004 establishments in Latvia
2006 disestablishments in Latvia
Cabinets established in 2004
Cabinets disestablished in 2006